Brandon Mosley (born December 21, 1988) is a former American football guard. He played college football for Auburn University and was drafted by the Giants in the 4th round of the 2012 NFL Draft.

High school career
Mosley attended Jefferson High School in Jefferson, Georgia, where he played defensive end for the Jefferson Dragons high school football team.

College career
Mosley attended Coffeyville Community College, where he played defensive end and tight end for the Coffeyville Red Ravens football team from 2008 to 2009.

Rated as a four-star recruit by Rivals.com, Mosley was ranked as the No. 19 junior college prospect in 2010.

Mosley accepted an athletic scholarship to attend Auburn University, where he played for coach Gene Chizik's Auburn Tigers football team from 2010 to 2011.

Mosley went on to become a two-year starter for the Tigers at right tackle.

Professional career
Mosley was selected with the 131st overall pick in the fourth round of the 2012 NFL Draft by the New York Giants. On September 1, 2015, he was waived/injured by the Giants. On the following day, Mosley cleared waivers and was reverted to the Giants' injured reserve list.

References

External links
 New York Giants bio
 Auburn Tigers bio

1988 births
Living people
American football offensive tackles
Auburn Tigers football players
Coffeyville Red Ravens football players
New York Giants players
People from Jefferson, Georgia
Players of American football from Georgia (U.S. state)